Composer is an album by pianist Cedar Walton which was recorded in 1996 and released on the Astor Place label.

Reception

Scott Yanow of AllMusic reviewed the album stating, "Walton is not normally thought of as a major composer. However, quite a few of his new pieces could possibly become standards in the future if jazz improvisers explore this disc... Highly recommended".

Track listing 
All compositions by Cedar Walton
 "Martha's Prize" - 6:15
 "The Vision" - 7:25
 "Happiness" - 5:51
 "Minor Controversy" - 7:14
 "Hindsight" - 8:21
 "Underground Memoirs" - 7:41
 "Theme for Jobim" - 6:17
 "Groove Passage" - 6:12
 "Ground Work" - 5:52

Personnel 
Cedar Walton - piano
Roy Hargrove - trumpet
Ralph Moore - soprano saxophone, tenor saxophone
Vincent Herring - alto saxophone
Christian McBride - bass
Victor Lewis - drums

Production
Don Sickler - producer
Jim Anderson - engineer

References 

Cedar Walton albums
1996 albums
Astor Place (label) albums